Black Cloud is a 2004 American drama film, which was directed, and written, by Rick Schroder, and starring Eddie Spears, Julia Jones, Russel Means, and Tim McGraw.

Black Cloud may refer to:

Books 
 The Black Cloud, a 1957 a science fiction novel by British astrophysicist Fred Hoyle
 Black Cloud, a 2017–2018 comic book series published by Image Comics
 Black Cloud, a story collection by Juliet Escoria
 Black Cloud: The Deadly Hurricane of 1928, by Eliot Kleinberg
 Pierrot the Clownfish: The Black Cloud, by Franck Le Calvez

Music

Albums 
 Black Cloud, album by Davina and the Vagabonds, 2011
 David Bazan's Black Cloud, working title for an album by David Bazan
 Black Cloud, mixtape album by Hell Rell
 Black Clouds, album by Outrage
 Black Clouds, mini-album by Grant Nicholas

Songs 
 "Black Cloud" a song by Converge from the compilation album Punk-O-Rama 10
 "Black Cloud", a song by Crazy Town from the album The Gift of Game
 "Black Clouds", a song by D-Black
 "Black Cloud", a song by DJ Format from the album If You Can't Join 'Em... Beat 'Em
 "Black Cloud", a song by Flotsam and Jetsam from the album The Cold
 "Black Cloud", a song by Honeyblood
 "Black Cloud", a song by Leroy Van Dyke
 "Black Cloud", a song by Louis Armstrong from the album Louis 'Country & Western' Armstrong
 "Black Cloud", a song by Morrissey on the album Years of Refusal
 "Black Clouds", a song by Nesey Gallons from the album Two Bicycles
 "Black Cloud", a song by Onion from the album Made from Plate
 "Black Cloud", a song by Operator from the album Soulcrusher
 "Black Cloud", a song by Pink Floyd keyboard player Richard Wright on the 1996 album Broken China
 "Black Cloud", a song by SNFU from the album If You Swear, You'll Catch No Fish
 "Black Cloud", a song by The Choir from the album Love Songs and Prayers: A Retrospective
 "Black Clouds", a song by The String Cheese Incident from the album Born on the Wrong Planet
 "Black Cloud", a song by Trapeze from the album Welcome to the Real World
 "Black Cloud", a song produced by Megaman & Zalezy from the compilation mixtape album Mood Muzik 4: A Turn 4 the Worst
 “Black Cloud”, a song by Nottingham band The Chase in 2021. 
 "Black Clouds", a song by Wiz Kilo

Other music
 Black Cloud Music, an American independent music label based in San Bernardino, California
 Black Cloud Collective, former name for Hell or Highwater, music side project by Brandon Saller

Film 
 Karmegham, English title Black Cloud, a 2002 Tamil drama film directed by S. P. Rajkumar

Characters 
 Black Cloud, as part of the Navajo creation story Diné Bahaneʼ
 Black Cloud, a character from the 1932 film My Pal, the King, portrayed by Jim Thorpe
 Black Cloud, a character from the 1953 Western film Last of the Comanches
 Black Cloud, a character from the 1955–56 television series Brave Eagle, portrayed by Pat Hogan
 Black Cloud, a character from the 1956 Western film Comanche
 Black Cloud, an organization in the animated television series MetaJets

Other uses 
 Black Cloud, or Software Defined Perimeter (SDP), an approach to computer security
 Karabulut, Turkish proper noun for Black Cloud
 Black Cloud Trail, a climbing trail on Mount Elbert
 Black Cloud mine, in the Leadville mining district
 Black Cloud, the title for the 2019 edition of the Kyiv Biennial
 Black Cloud Project, exhibition by Vibha Galhotra
 Black Cloud, exhibition by Carlos Amorales
 "The Black Cloud", an episode from the animated television series Fantaghirò

See also 
 Black Clouds & Silver Linings, album by Dream Theater
 Cloud, an atmospheric phenomenon
 Dark Cloud (disambiguation)
 List of cloud types